Mesostalita is a genus of  woodlouse hunting spiders that was first described by Christa L. Deeleman-Reinhold in 1971.  it contains only three species: M. comottii, M. kratochvili, and M. nocturna.

References

Araneomorphae genera
Dysderidae